Wings Greatest is a 1978 compilation album by the British–American rock band Wings and their eighth album as well as Paul McCartney's tenth since leaving the Beatles. It was the band's last release through Capitol in the US. The album is notable as being the first official retrospective release from McCartney's post-Beatles career.

Wings Greatest was remastered and reissued in 1993, as part of The Paul McCartney Collection, and again in 2018.

History
The album was compiled after McCartney's decision to leave EMI's American label, Capitol, for a six-year stay with Columbia (United States and Canada only), though he remained with EMI worldwide during his US sabbatical from Capitol. Four of the twelve tracks make their album debut with this compilation: "Another Day", "Junior's Farm", "Hi, Hi, Hi" and "Mull of Kintyre". "Live and Let Die" had previously appeared on the soundtrack album of the same name but did not appear on any previous McCartney albums.

All but two tracks were credited as "Wings" or "Paul McCartney & Wings"; the exceptions being "Another Day" (a non-album single credited to just "Paul McCartney") and "Uncle Albert/Admiral Halsey" (credited to "Paul & Linda McCartney") from their 1971 album Ram.

Despite the fact that McCartney had amassed enough successful singles by late 1978 to potentially fill a double album, he opted to release Wings Greatest as a single disc for commercial reasons. Thus, several songs would be overlooked for Wings Greatest. Indeed, not one song was excerpted from 1975's Venus and Mars, despite "Listen to What the Man Said" being a number 1 US hit. The album was promoted by a TV commercial in the UK, which featured several members of the public (played by actors) singing Wings tunes in public places. At the end a dustman, waiting in his lorry at a set of traffic lights (in Abbey Road), sings to himself an out of tune rendition of "Band on the Run", at which point Paul, Linda and Denny pull up alongside and Paul shouts out "You're a bit flat mate!". The driver leans out his window and says "Funny, I only checked them this morning!"

The Bulgarian pressings of the album did not include the song "Live and Let Die".

Artwork
Aubrey Powell and George Hardie of Hipgnosis are credited with the design, as well as Paul and Linda McCartney.

The front cover of Wings Greatest depicts a chryselephantine (gold and ivory) statuette created by famed Art Deco sculptor Demétre Chiparus. This antique statuette was purchased by Linda McCartney at a 1978 auction and Paul McCartney decided this statuette would be ideal as the cover for the band's forthcoming greatest hits album.

On 14 October 1978, the McCartney family flew to Switzerland, accompanied by a photographer named Angus Forbes, to arrange a photography session depicting the statuette in genuine snow. The snowdrift backdrop within the image was created with the assistance of a hired snow-plough, and the actual image upon the cover was an aerial photograph taken by helicopter.

The rear cover depicts the record covers of the twelve releases, mostly singles, from which each of the Greatest's songs were taken, in columns on either side of the album. In the middle is a photograph of Paul, Linda, and Denny Laine. The original photograph also had Jimmy McCulloch and Joe English, but both members had left the band by the time this greatest hits album was issued and, as a result, were airbrushed out. The background is another scene of the Alps.

The statuette also appears on the inner sleeves of the original vinyl, as well as on the record's labels. It can also be seen on the album cover of Wings' next (and last) studio album, Back to the Egg, in the background, on the mantlepiece.

Track listing

Charts

Weekly charts

Year-end charts

Certifications

References

1978 greatest hits albums
Paul McCartney and Wings compilation albums
Albums produced by Paul McCartney
Parlophone compilation albums
Capitol Records compilation albums
Albums recorded at Trident Studios